Celeste (Light Blue, in Spanish) is a city in Hunt County, in the U.S. state of Texas. The population was 814 at the 2010 census.

History

Like many towns in Hunt County, Celeste was a product of railroad development. This location was chosen in order to ensure that Kingston, whose elected officials had refused to offer incentives to attract the Gulf, Colorado and Santa Fe to build through their community, would be bypassed by the line as it put down tracks from Paris through Farmersville to Dallas.

Celeste was named for the wife of a Santa Fe official. The two rail lines stimulated rapid growth. A post office opened in Celeste in 1886, and a number of merchants moved their businesses from Kingston to Celeste. By 1888 three churches were holding services in the settlement. The population by the mid-1890s stood at 600, and the community maintained three gristmills and cotton gins, a bank, a weekly newspaper, and a graded public school. Celeste was incorporated in 1900, and its population increased from 671 that year to 850 on the eve of World War I.

By 1914 the community had two banks, three cotton gins, a water works, an ice factory, and a weekly newspaper, as well as some thirty-five other businesses. It reported a population of 1,022 by 1926. Its high school and two elementary schools registered 500 students. Some fifty business establishments, including two banks and a newspaper, were in operation. After the 1920s, however, the population of Celeste fell from 803 in 1933 to 518 in the mid-1960s; businesses correspondingly declined, from thirty to sixteen. After the 1960s the town revived; in 1976 its population was 745. In 1982 the community, where World War II hero Audie Murphy once lived, had a bank, four churches, ten stores, and a school that enrolled 300 students. The population was 733 in 1990 and 817 in 2010.

Geography
Celeste is in northwestern Hunt County along U.S. Route 69, which leads northwest  to Denison and southeast  to Greenville the Hunt county seat.

Demographics

As of the 2020 United States census, there were 809 people, 320 households, and 252 families residing in the city.

Education
The city is served by the Celeste Independent School District and is home to the Celeste High School Blue Devils.

Notable people

 Clint Lorance (born 1984), Army officer convicted of second-degree murder for battlefield deaths; pardoned
 Audie Murphy the most decorated soldier in World War II, was born four and a half miles south of Celeste on June 20, 1924. Audie Murphy lived for a short period of time in Celeste, Texas with his family and at one point, the Murphy family stayed in an abandoned railroad box car. While at Celeste, Murphy was enrolled in the local school through the 8th grade

References

Dallas–Fort Worth metroplex
Cities in Texas
Cities in Hunt County, Texas